There are many places where social nudity is practised for recreation in Europe. The following list includes nude beaches (also known as clothing-optional beaches or free beaches) and some naturist resorts.

Austria 
Naturism is popular in Austria, with social nudity places typically indicated by FKK signs. Designated locations include camping spots, beaches, and hotels.
 Keutschacher See in Carinthia
 Tigringer See
 Pleschinger See
 Weikerlsee
 Fuschlsee

In Vienna the following beaches can be found

 Donauinsel (an artificial island in the Danube quite close to the city centre)
 Gänsehäufel
 Lobau

Belgium 
Public saunas in Belgium are always mixed gender and nudity is the norm when using these. Topfree sunbathing is tolerated on all beaches.
 Athena Hélios in Meerbeek
 Athena Le Perron naturist camping site in Waimes
 Bockstaelhoeve in Zegelsem
 Bredene was the first official nude beach in Belgium.
 Since 2021, Lombardsijde is the official second nude beach in the country.
 Natuur Puur in Herselt
 't Vennebos Natuurleven in Langdorp-Aarschot
 Naturistencamping Grensland

Bulgaria 
Unlike the former East Germany, but like many other countries that were part of the Communist bloc Bulgaria's nudists were kept cordoned off behind tall fences. There are however a number beaches on the Bulgarian Black Sea Coast where nudism is practised; there are no official nude beaches. People always enter naked in public baths, but those are separate for men and women.
 Primorsko
 Sunny Beach
 Sozopol
 Irakli
 Silistar
Ahtopol
 Camping Delfin
 Baltata
 Panorama
 Galata
 Fichoza
 Tsarski
 Alepu
 Arkutino
 Ropotamo Mouth
 Perla
 Dolphin Beach
 Lipite
 Listi
Sinemorets

Crimea 

 Koktebel, formerly known as Planerskoye, located in south-eastern Crimea.
 Lisya buhta, a remote place in south-east Crimea, popular with nudists, ravers and Rastafari in the summer.

Croatia 

 

Croatia has a well developed naturist culture with camp sites and hotels specifically catering for naturists.  Naturism has been popular in Croatia ever since the future King Edward VIII and his then-mistress, Wallis Simpson, were allowed to swim nude at one of Rab's beaches in 1936. Toplessness is permitted on most beaches.

Istria peninsula 
On the Istria peninsula the following nude beaches and resorts can be found:

 Naturist Park Koversada, located at  near Vrsar is the biggest and one of the first naturist resorts in Europe.
 Camping Valalta, located at  near Rovinj.
 Naturist Resort Solaris, located at  near Poreč.
 Kamp Kažela, Medulin
 Camp Punta Eva-Polari, Rovinj
 Camping Zelena Laguna, Poreč
 Kamp Ulika, Červar
 Camp Kanegra, Crveni Vrh

Kvarner gulf 
In the Kvarner gulf the following nude beaches and resorts can be found:

Camping Politin, now known as Camping Krk was a naturist resort but is now a textile only campsite
 Camping Strasko, Novalja

Dalmatia 
In Dalmatia gulf the following nude beaches and resorts can be found:

 Kašjuni beach, Split.
 Nugal Beach, between Makarska and Tučepi.
 Sv. Petar beach, central Makarska town.
 Lokrum island (beach), Dubrovnik.
 Camp Sovinje, Tkon
 Jerolim, Paklinski Islands, Island of Hvar
 Glavica Beach and Camp Nudist, Vrboska, Island of Hvar
 Zecevo Beach, Island Zečevo Vrboska, Island of Hvar
 Kamp Mlaska, Sućuraj, Island of Hvar
 Mekićevica Beach, Hvar (150 m west of Robinson restaurant).
 Robinson beach, Hvar. Toplessness is common, and naturism begins 50 metres south of the restaurant.
 Zlatni Rat (Bol, island of Brac). Toplessness is common on the whole spit. Naturism is common on the north-western portion of the beach (on the west side, away from the tip of the spit) and there is a small naturist beach to the west, beyond the rocks. There are additional naturist beaches further west, which can be reached from the promenade via steep paths.

Cyprus 

There are no legal nudist beaches in Cyprus. A number of beaches, including the beach at Avdimou, have signs warning that nudism is not permitted. A community leader of Pissouri said that for decades there has been an "unspoken understanding" whereby nudism would be tolerated at an area away from the main beach at Pissouri, but not on the beach of Pissouri Bay. According to the community leader, nudists may visit the area which is on the eastern side of the bay, beyond the cliffs, as it offers some privacy.
 Paphos - Akamas - Lara Beach is the turtle beach, a sandy beach with warm water. Nudists are found there mostly during the winter as the weather is pleasant all year around.
 Ammoui Beach, Lara Beach is located in the Akamas Peninsula in the Paphos District of Cyprus. It is a long sandy beach and is quiet for its size. Nudists stay at the far end near the white cliffs.

Czechia 
Topfree is tolerated in all places.  Public nudity is not illegal in the Czech Republic, but it may be regulated by local authorities.
 There are about one hundred officially recognized naturist localities.

Denmark 
Since 1976 it is permissible to be nude at any beach in Denmark. A large number of clothing-optional beaches exist throughout the country.

The beach at the village of Husby in the Holstebro Municipality is being promoted as a FKK beach.

Naturist swims are held in the Blovstrød (Allerød Municipality) indoor swimming pool on Friday evenings in Autumn.

Estonia 
Estonian naturist beaches used to be overseen by the NGO Estnat (which closed in 2012). No tickets are necessary.

 Tallinn has an unofficial, but tolerated naturist beach. It is situated about 3 km north-west of the ferry port, at the very northern end of the textile beach. The nude beach is near (west of) the textile beach at Pikakari beach. A few minutes walk through the forest, around 
 Tartu has an unofficial naturist lawn beach which is situated right next the city one at the end of Ranna tee (on the other side of the Emajõgi river from Supilinn pond).
 Pärnu has an unofficial but tolerated woman's and men's beach between the official beach and Pärnu river.
 Narva-Jõesuu nude beach – the only official nude beach in Estonia. Located near Narva-Jõesuu town, 2 km SW from the town border.
 Saaremaa has unofficial nude beach at Järve. Nudists use beach area near "Järve turismitalu" road sign.

Finland 

 Helsinki:
 Pihlajasaari: Has a unisex nudist beach, consisting almost entirely of rocky cliffs, with no sand. Not very suitable for swimming.
 Seurasaari: Separate nudist beaches for men and women. No unisex nudist area.
 Yrjönkatu Swimming Hall: a swimming hall in a historic architecture. Gender separated by day of week.
A small section of the Yyteri beach near Pori is designated as a unisex nudist beach. A flat beach covered in sand and much more suitable for swimming than Pihlajasaari. Yyteri nudist beach is closed starting summer 2021.
 The Tulliranta beach near Hanko has a designated nudist section.

France 

 There are many naturist resorts on the Atlantic coast, for example CHM Montalivet, Euronat and La Jenny.
 The Mediterranean seaside town of Cap d'Agde has a large naturist village with sandy beach, several swimming pools, but also nude shopping.
 Aphrodite Village, Oasis Village, Village camping Ulysse, Eden Plage, are open 300 days per year.
 Île du Levant, an island in the Mediterranean Sea has a nudist town, Héliopolis, and a nudist beach known as Plage des Grottes.
 Plage de Pampelonne in Ramatuelle near Saint-Tropez
 Plage du Layet near Cavalaire.
 There are beaches on many rivers, some well known, some informal: Cèze, Ardèche, Truyère
 Topfreedom is tolerated (and common) on almost all beaches

Alsace 
Naturist venues in Alsace.

 Association Naturiste de Sauvegarde et d’Animation du Blauelsand (ANSAB)
 Centre Gymnique d’Alsace
 Les Naturistes d’Alsace
 Club du Soleil Mulhouse
 Gravière du Blauelsand

Aquitaine 

Naturist venues in Aquitaine.

 Arnaoutchot Arna Natu-Resort and Spa in Vielle-Saint-Girons
 Association Naturiste d’Euronat et du Sud-Ouest (ANESO)
 Bouhebent Naturisme
 Camping naturiste Le Coteau de l’Herm in Dordogne
 Camping Naturiste Le Couderc in Dordogne
 Centre naturiste Terme d'Astor in Dordogne
 Château Guiton
 Club du Soleil Bordeaux Côte d’Argent
 Club du Soleil Dordogne Périgord
 Club Hendaye Nature et Soleil du Pays Basque (CHENASO)
 Centre Hélio-Marin de Montalivet
 Club Loisirs Naturiste du Centre Hélio-Marin de Montalivet
 Montalivet
 Club Naturiste des Pays de l’Adour / Les Coges
 Domaine naturiste de Chaudeau in Saint-Géraud-de-Corps
 Euronat
 FEN Le Coteau de l'Herm in Rouffignac-Saint-Cernin
 Hossegor
 La Jenny in Le Porge
 La Lagune
 Laborde in Monflanquin
 Laulurie en Périgord
 Le Marcassin de Saint-Aubin
 Les Naturistes amis de la Côte Aquitaine (NACA)
 Métro
 Ondres
 Saint-Nicolas
 Seignosse
 Terme d’Astor
 Thermes de Salies-de-Béarn

Auvergne 
 Cantal Soleil Nature (Cansonat)
 Ferme du Feyt
 Domaine de la Taillade
 Les Fourneaux
 Club du Soleil de Clermont-Ferrand / La Serre de Portelas
 Nature et Amitié d’Ébreuil
 Amicale Des Naturistes Montluçonnais Montluçon
 Centre Aqualudique De La Loue Montluçon
 La Chambre d’Alice

Basse-Normandie 
 Nature et Soleil de Normandie
 Plages Soleil et Naturisme
 Saint-Germain naturisme
 Club du Soleil Normandie-Maine
 Pointe d’Agon
 La Pointe du Banc

Bretagne 
 Club du Soleil des Côtes-d’Armor 
 Les Chevrets
 Garden Gym
 Plage de Kerler
 Piscine Foch
 Plage de Kéranouat
 Pallieter
 Mez An Aod ou Beg Leguer
 Le Lourtouais
 Association Naturiste Finistérienne (Anf)
 Association des Randonneurs Naturistes de Bretagne (ARNB)
 Association naturiste et sportive de la Côte d’Émeraude (ANSCE) 
 Club du Soleil de Rennes
 Club naturiste de Bretagne Sud / La Pinède
 Club naturiste morbihanais / Camping Les Bruyères d’Arvor
 Erdeven-Kerminihy

Bourgogne 
 Camping Borvo 
 Club du Soleil de Dijon
 Domaine de la Gagère
 Le Gîte des Chênes
 L’Eau vive
 Champagne Manoir
 Club du Soleil de Chalon-sur-Saône
 Club du Soleil de Mâcon-Laizé / La Breur
 Stade nautique d’Auxerre

Centre-Val de Loire 
 Club du Soleil Berry Nivernais 
 Club des Amis du Châtaignier
 Aurore Plage Nature
 La Petite Brenne
 Club Soleil et Loisirs de l’Indre
 Le Moulin de la Ronde
 Club des Amis de La Petite Brenne
 Club du Soleil de Touraine
 Club du Soleil du Loir-et-Cher
 Association Joie et Santé / Les Bogues
 Piscine municipale d’Argenton-sur -Creuse
 Centre Aquatique

Champagne-Ardenne 
 Gymno Club De La Cressonnière Ardennaise (Gcca) 
 Club du Soleil de Troyes
 Simplicité et Joie in Troyes

Corsica 

Corsica is the fifth most popular naturist destination in France.

 Riva Bella spa Thalasso Village Naturiste in Aleria - Corse
 Camping Village Vacances Bagheera in Bravone - Corse
 Village La Chiappa
 U’Furu
 Club Corsicana
 Corsica Natura
 Les Eucalyptus
 Riva Bella Nature Thalasso & Spa Resort
 Club Aqua Nature de Balagne C/O Jean-Jacques Santoni 
 Domaine de Bagheera

Franche-Comté 
 Club Naturiste de Besançon
 Club du Soleil de Dole
 Chalain Nature
 Club du Soleil de Belfort-Montbéliard
 Lac de Chalain

Haute-Normandie 
 Association Naturiste du Département de l’Eure
 Club du Soleil de la Porte Océane
 Camping Club de France (siège national)
 Club naturiste du Bois Mareuil
 Club des Naturistes Rouennais / La Chênaie
 Association Familiale des Naturistes Valériquais
 Piscine municipale République
 L’Escamet

Île-de-France 
 Air et Soleil
 Association des Jeunes Naturistes de France (AJNF)
 Association des Naturistes de Paris
 Association pour le Naturisme en Liberté (APNEL)
 Centre Nautique Roger Le Gall
 Club du Soleil de l’Essonne / Les Bois de Valence
 Club du Soleil de Versailles
 Club du Soleil France
 Club du Soleil Montagne
 Club du Soleil Nature
 Club gymnique de France (CGF)
 Fédération Française de Camping Caravaning (FFCC)
 Héliomonde, leisure naturist village in Ile-de-France.
 Imaginat
 Les Hespérides
 Nautena (Nautisme et Naturisme) in Paris, France

Languedoc-Roussillon 
The following are nudist venues in the Languedoc-Roussillon region.

Limousin 
 Creuse Nature Naturisme in Boussac - Limousin
 Lac de Vassivière
 Le Mas d’Ayen
 Domaine des Monts de Bussy in Eymoutiers - Limousin
 Natco (Naturistes Corréziens)
 Creuse Nature
 Domaine Naturiste Le Fayard
 Camping Aimée Porcher
 Club du Soleil de Limoges / Bos-Redon
 Piscine Saint-Lazare
 Les Saules
 Camping Lous Suais

Lorraine 
 Union Gymnique de Lorraine
 Club du Soleil de Nancy
 Club naturiste de la Meuse
 Lorraine Nature de Thionville
 Club du Soleil des Vosges
 Piscine Ronde Thermale
 Piscine Olympique Roger Goujon

Midi-Pyrénées 
 Camping de la Lèze
 Camping Hélio Nature L'Églantière in Castelnau-Magnoac
 Camping Naturiste Deveze in Gaudonville
 Camping Naturiste Les Aillos in Caraman - Midi-pyrénées
 Centre Naturiste Le Fiscalou Puycelsi - Midi-pyrénées
 Club du Soleil de Valeilles
 Club naturiste en Albigeois / La Couliche
 Domaine de Lalbrade in Lugagnac - Midi-pyrénées
 Domaine de Sarraute
 Le Champ de Guiral
 Le Clos Barrat
 Le Fiscalou
 Les Aillos
 Les Grands Chênes
 Les Manoques
 Millefleurs

Nord-Pas-de-Calais 
 Plein Air Relax Club (PARC)
 Centre Gymnique du Nord
 Éden Avesnois / Centre Aquadétente
 Club Originelle
 Natura International
 Association Gymnique Amicale du Boulonnais à la Somme (AGABS)
 Élan Naturiste de la Côte d’Opale et sa Région (ENCOR)
 Camping du Pont Charlet
 Piscine municipale d’Halluin
 Plage Nature

Pays de la Loire 
 Aquabaule
 Association Bol d’Air Naturiste (ABOLD’NAT)
 Association naturiste de la Côte d’Amour (ANCA) / Le Clos Marot
 Association naturiste vendéenne
 Choiseau
 Club gymnique de l’Ouest (CGO) / La Chataigneraie d’Armor
 La Petite Vallée
 La Pointe d’Arcay
 La Terrière
 Le Colombier
 Le Petit Pont
 Les Conches
 Les Jaunais
 Les Lays
 Les Salins
 Les Saulaies
 Loisirs Vacances Naturisme (LVN)
 Mayenne Nature
 NatAnjou
 Naturistes Sarthois
 Olonne-sur-Mer
 Pen Bron
 Piscine de Belle Beille
 Piscine de Coubertin
 Piscine Durantière

Picardie 
 SCN Regain
 Club des Amis de Regain
 Gymno Club de Thelle
 Club du Soleil de Creil
 Plage de l’Amer Sud

Poitou-Charentes 
 Camping du Port
 Charente Soleil
 Club du Soleil Aunis et Saintonge 
 Club du Soleil de Poitiers / La Pardière
 Club Naturiste des Charentes
 Ferme naturiste L’Oliverie
 La Côte Sauvage : La Pointe Espagnole
 La Giraudière (Oléron)
 La Grande Côte : La Lède
 La Grande Côte : Les Combôts
 La Grande Plage (Oléron)
 Le Petit Dauphin
 Les Saumonards (Oléron, après Boyardville)
 Nautilis centre nautique

Provence-Alpes-Côte d'Azur

Rhône-Alpes 
 Domaine Le Pont d'Adèle
 Club du Soleil de Valence
 Loisirs et Soleil de Saint Etienne / Le Dorier
 Val Drôme Soleil
 Club du Soleil de Roanne
 Piscine Tournesol Valence le Haut
 Club du Soleil Savoie Nature
 Club du Soleil Alpes Léman
 Club du Soleil du Mont Blanc
 Domaine du Grand Bois
 Gymno Club Rhodanien 
 Club du Soleil de Saint-Étienne / La Robertanne
 La Plage des Templiers in Bourg-Saint-Andréol - Rhône-alpes
 Club du Soleil de Lyon in Lyon
 Le Chanozois 15 km of Bourg-en-Bresse
 Club Du Soleil Les Hérissons Sergy
 Club Naturiste des Gorges de l’Ardèche (Cnga)
 Domaine du Pont d’Adèle
 Club du Soleil du Nord Isère
 Les Amis d’Alpes et Solei
 Club du Soleil de Grenoble / Le Courtialet
 La Plage des Templiers
 Piscine Bellevue
 Lac de Laffrey
 Plage de la Mama
 La Pinède

Overseas departments

Caribbean

Guadeloupe in the Antilles 
 Résidence Éden Nat
 Club Caribbean Nature
 Club Orient
 Résidence Naturelle
 Location Naturiste Saint-Francois Guadeloupe
 Anse Tarare (Beach)

Martinique in the Antilles 
 Beach Anse Trabaud
 La Plage des Salines
 Plage Naturiste de Fond Moustique
 Croisière naturiste sur mothaline

Germany 

Public nudity is not illegal in Germany but may be regulated by local authorities mostly because of safety and health issues, not morality. Apart from urban areas and public baths (some of which offer nude swimming days), nude bathing is common in Germany: unofficial clothing optional areas exist at most lakes and rivers and other sites, such as abandoned sand and rock quarries. Many designated Freikörperkultur (FKK – Free Body Culture) areas exist at the seaside, at lakes and in baths, especially in the former East Germany, where nudism remains more widespread than in the west.  For example, Miramar (located in Weinheim), has a weekly FKK night where there is nude bathing in the entire complex - aside from the waterslides, which require a bathing suit to use.  Many unregulated clothing optional (FKK) free beaches are available along the Nordsee and Baltic seashores, Rügen and other islands. The attitude is: all beaches are nude beaches until somebody complains. Families especially like to spend their leisure time in naturist areas; sauna bathing is generally practised in the nude.

The list of social nudity places in Germany includes:

 The Schönfeldwiese in the Englischer Garten, Munich as well as the southern part of Feldmochinger See, in the northwestern suburb, the peninsula in Lake Feringasee in the northeast and the :de:Flaucher at the river Isar south of the city center of Munich.
 The Tiergarten, Berlin
 Strandbad Wannsee, Großer Wannsee, Wannsee, Berlin
 Travemünde
 Sylt
 Grömitz
 Borkum
 Norderney
 Lake Senftenberg, Oberspreewald-Lausitz, Brandenburg
 Baden-Baden is a city located near the French border. This city has many natural mineral springs and numerous clothes free bath houses are located there.
 Zeesen

Greece 

Naturism is practised widely in the Greek Islands although, strictly speaking, legal only in a relatively few designated locations but almost on all islands there are unofficial nudist beaches. Topfree is tolerated on almost all beaches.

Crete 
Beaches and resorts in Crete include:

 Filaki beach, the only official nudist beach near the Vritomartis naturist resort.
 Glyka Nera (Sweet water beach) between Chora Sfakion and Loutro.
 Diskos near Lentos.
 Plakias, the south-eastern part of the beach is used by naturists.
 North of Matala there is a long nude beach; the southern end of the beach is used by clothed people.
 Sougia, the eastern part of the beach is for nude bathing.

Other areas 
 Vlychada beach on Santorini; the southern part of the beach is used by naturists.
 Velanio beach on Skopelos island, Northern Sporades.
 Mouda beach, a great wild sandy beach south of Kefalonia island, Ionian Islands.
 Myrtos Beach, a long white pebble beach in Kefalonia.
 Mantomata Beach in Faliraki is the only official nudist beach on Rhodes, though there are more beaches where nudism is common, for example a part of Kallithea, Rhodes.
 Katergo and Agios Nikolaos beaches on  Folegandros island.
 Mirtiotissa beach (Paralia Mirtiotissa) on Corfu' island. A sandy beach surrounded by rocks, accessible by car.

Hungary 

 Aqua Land, Ráckeve – naturist sauna and bathing nights
 Gárdony 
 Ányás
 Balatonakali, Levendula Naturista Kemping. Closed for 2021.
 Balatonberény, Balatontourist Berény Naturista Kemping
 Kiskundorozsma, Sziksósfürdö (a.k.a. "Sziki"), Szeged, Sziksósfürdő Naturista Strand és Kemping, Szeged, Vereshomok dűlő 1, 6791
Lupa beach, has a smaller area for naturist
 Délegyháza, Naturista Oázis Camping lake no. 5 and other lakes around – 30 km south from Budapest
 Nemesbük, Angela Farm Naturist Camping & Bungalowpark  Closed
 Szalk, Szalkszentmárton
 Szigetmonostor, Horány beach
 Dunaparti, Kiskunlacháza

Iceland 
Public nudity is not common. However, there are a number of hot springs across the island that are either free of charge or voluntary contribution based where nudity can be practised.

 Hrunalaug (Hruni hot springs), Sólheimar, Iceland
 Kualaug hot spring, Haukadalsvegur, Iceland
 Brennisteinsalda Laugasvæði
 Seljavellir Geothermal Pool
 Reykjadalur Hot Spring Trailhead, if you go to the lower pools downstream you can be naked and secluded from other hikers.
 Guðrúnarlaug hot spring
 Hellulaug
 Pollurinn hot springs
 Jarðböðin við Mývatn
 Grjótagjá cave, next to Mývatn
 Hoffell Hot Tubs

Ireland 
 Brittas Bay, County Wicklow.
 Corballis, Donabate, County Dublin.
 Hawk Cliff, Dalkey, County Dublin, is the first official nudist beach in Ireland. It opened in April 2018.
 Roundstone, County Galway.
 Silver Strand Beach, Barna, County Galway.
 West Cork, County Cork.
Curracloe strand is used by naturists and it has been proposed as an official naturist beach.

Italy 
Female toplessness has been officially legalized (in a nonsexual context) in all public beaches and swimming pools throughout the country (unless otherwise specified by region, province or municipality by-laws) on 20 March 2000, when the Supreme Court of Cassation (through sentence No. 3557) has determined that the exposure of the nude female breast, after several decades, is now considered a "commonly accepted behavior", and therefore, has "entered into the social costume".

Abruzzo 
 Official authorized nude-beach "Le Morge", in Torino di Sangro.

Calabria 
 Nudist beach of Pizzo Greco Naturist Camping, in Isola di Capo Rizzuto.

Campania 
 Official nude beach "Spiaggia del Troncone" (Troncone beach), in Marina di Camerota. State road SS 562, coming from Palinuro towards Marina di Camerota before entering tunnel. Located at 40.006826, 15.340612
The beach is protected by a rock wall, containing a recess with natural shade.

Emilia-Romagna 
 Official nude beach "Lido di Dante" in Ravenna. Located at 
 A beach on the River Trebbia near Bobbio - km 81. state road 45, a place suitable for all.

Friuli-Venezia Giulia 
 Cava Casali beach near Sistiana and Duino Trieste – km. 137 state road 14.
 Costa dei Barbari beach near Sistiana and Duino Trieste – km. 139 state road 14.
 Filtri beach near Sistiana and  Trieste – km. 143 state road 14, difficult to reach.

Lazio 
 Arenauta beach near Gaeta– km. 24,5 state road 213.
 Oasi di Capocotta, to the south-west, on the Tyrrhenian sea, an official nudist beach on the coast between Ostia and Torvaianica.
 Lake Martignano, a small lake near Falconeto and Anguillara Sabazia. The side to the right of the main beach, very far from the entrance, is reserved to nudism (avoid bringing music).
 Black sand beach (Spiaggia delle sabbie nere) is a beach on the coast South of the Santa Severa Castle. It has historically been frequented by naturists, and since 2021 it has been officially authorized for the practice of naturism.

Liguria 
  Guvano beach near Corniglia – The beach is accessible, from the railway station, via a disused railway tunnel.
 Chiavari beach (an unofficial, but tolerated naturist beach, at the very western end of textiler beach).

Lombardy 
 La Rocca nude beach in Manerba del Garda located at  nudism from 1956. This is an unofficial Lake Garda nudist beach, and there are frequent police checks to fine those who are naked.

Piedmont 
 Official nudist beach near Varallo Sesia.

Sardinia 
 Dunas de Piscinas, part of Costa verde, close to Arbus, has the biggest authorised nudist-beach in Europe, with roughly 800 meters of sand and dunes. It is a wild corner of Sardinia, with only one big hotel nearby
 "Is Benas" beach, on the Sardinian western coast, close to Oristano. It is a long sandy beach, surrounded by pine trees. This beach is rich in colorful shells. It has been authorized for naturism since 2022 .
 Part of the Porto Ferro beach, near Alghero and Sassari, is authorised for naturist bathing
 A secluded beach between Terra Mala and Geremeas is under authorization by the municipality of Quartu Sant'Elena.
 The municipality of Bari Sardo announced the possible future authorisation for nudism of part of the beach nearby, called Mindeddu beach.
 Hundreds of small, secluded beaches can occasionally become nudist corners. Traditional places are the beaches Cala di Volpe, Liscia di Vacca, to the north of Pitrizza Hotel and Piccolo Pevero beach, the far side to the right after the rocks.
 Capo Falcone near Stintino.
 Marina di Arbus, Costa Verde. The rough west coast has lonely beaches and coves for sunbathing. The area is less developed for tourists, so you can enjoy nature.

Sicily 
Many beaches in Sicily are topless, and there are also naturist beaches.
 Torre Salsa, close to Siculiana, is inside a WWF protected area. On the eastern end of the beach, close to the white cliffs, there is an unofficial naturist wide sandy beach, mostly frequented by couples and families.
 Bulala, Gela (CL), is an official naturist beach, authorized in 2016. It is a wide sandy beach, and at the moment no services are available.
 The Baglio Maragani Country House has a dedicated naturist beach, available for the B&B customers or for daily visits (a fee is required) 
 Eloro–Marianelli beach within Vendicari natural preserve, in the municipality of Noto (SR). Suitable for naturist bathers and popular within the gay community.
 A small part of the beach at Marinello natural preserve between Oliveri and Patti (ME) has been unofficially attended by naturists for many years, especially in the low season.
 Capo Feto beach in Mazara del Vallo
 Casello 41 beach in Selinunte
 San Saba beach in Messina, on the Tyrrenian coast about 20 km from the city center, has been an official naturist beach since 2022.

Tuscany 
 A nudist beach is in Capalbio.
 Official nudist beach called "Nido dell'Aquila" in San Vincenzo (Livorno)
Marina di Bibbona (Livorno)
 On Elba island, the beaches Acquarilli Capoliveri and Fetovaia.
 In Marina di Alberese (Grosseto) naturism has always been accepted on all its beaches. Less frequently there are naturists on the northern beaches, while the greatest number of naturists can be found on the Beach of Collelungo and on the adjacent Ultima Spiaggia (Last Beach).
 South of Principina a Mare (Grosseto) there is a beach called I Tronchi (the trunks) or Spiaggia delle Capanne (beach of the huts) where there has always been a fair number of naturists.
 In the northernmost beach of Marina di Grosseto (Grosseto), beyond the last bathing establishment there is the Spiaggia delle Marze (beach of the slips) which has always been frequented by naturists with great discretion.

Veneto 
 Spiaggia del Mort Nudist Beach in "Isola del Mort" island, near Jesolo.
 Nudist beach "Baia delle sirene" at Punta S. Vigilio near the town of Garda (VR).
 Alberoni beach, Lido di Venezia, Venice.
Costa sabbiosa Lazzaretto,Verona

Latvia 

Latvian naturist beaches are overseen by the "Latvian Naturist Association".

 Ventspils city has an official naturist beach.
 Liepāja official naturist beach. Also quite small, situated about 3 km south of Liepaja. Green signs mark the beginning and the end of the beach. It has removable toilet during the summer.

Lithuania 
Nudist beaches in Lithuania are overseen by local communities.

Luxembourg 
 De Reenert (Wiltz)
 Camping Bleesbruck (Bleesbruck)

Malta 

Qarraba Bay. The bay is very secluded and can only be reached by a hike or boat. (Nudity is against Maltese law, but it is tolerated in this bay.)

Montenegro 
 Ada Bojana, the biggest nudist beach in the country.
 Jaz, the southernmost part of the beach used to be declared nudist but was made regular in 2007
 Ratac, is outside Bar in the direction of Budva, near Sutomore
 Njivice, a village on the south-western shore of the Bay of Herceg Novi (Boka Kotorska bay) the nudist beach is located on Hotel Riviera's beach
 Camp Full Monte, A clothing optional, off-grid, eco campsite close the Montenegro/Croatia border crossing, run by an English couple.
 Crvena Glavica beach, Sveti Stefan
 Hotel Albatros in Ulcinj has two beaches, a textile beach, and a nudist beach.

Netherlands 
Public saunas in the Netherlands are always mixed gender and nudity is the norm when using these. In the Netherlands tanning top free is legal on almost all beaches. Municipalities with a beach (usually including quiet parts) tend to have a nudist beach; even if the municipality does not like it, it designates a quiet part as such in order to be able to forbid nudity on the rest of the beach.
 Almere, Zilverstrand
 Amsterdamse Bos, Zonneweide  (from 1 April to 30 September)
 Lake Gaasperplas near Amsterdam access Gaasperplas metro station.
 Bussloo, longest nude beach in the Netherlands
 Bloemendaal aan Zee, nude beach at the north part of the beach
 Callantsoog, sandy beach  to the south - the oldest official nude beach in the country, dating from 1973
 Grote Plas in Delft, northeast side
 Scheveningen, The Hague, sandy beach 1 km to the north
 Noordwijk, North past sand dunes and World War II era bunkers
 The Hague, Zuiderstrand, approx.  of sandy beach
 Kijkduin, The Hague, two beaches
 IJmuiden, nude beach at the south part of the beach
 Zandvoort, sandy beach  to the south
 Vrouwenpolder, sandy beach.
Veluwse Bron wellness resort

A pretty complete list of nude beaches in the Netherlands can be found on the Dutch-language website naaktstrandje.nl. Here you can click on the province of your choice and get a list of beaches and other nudist activities.

Norway 

 In and around Oslo
 Huk on the Bygdøy peninsula
 Svartkulp near Sognsvann
 the south east side of the islands Langøyene
 Kalvøya
 Svartskog in Bunnefjorden.
 In and around Bergen
 Kollevågen on the island Askøy
 Rishavn
Sjøhaug Naturist Centre outside Moss on Jeløya

Poland 

 Inland
 Wał Miedzeszyński in Warsaw
 Wał Zawadowski in Warsaw
 Kryspinów near Kraków
 Biskupice near Poznań
 Kęty near Bielsko-Biała
 Cezar naturist recreational centre in Bielsko-Biała
 Gospodarstwo agroturystyczne near Włocławek 
 Wyzwanie in Parcele

Portugal 
 
 Praia da Adiça Costa da Caparica
 Ursa Beach, Sintra
 Praia dos Alteirinhos, Zambujeira do Mar
 Ilha de Tavira in Algarve 
Praia da Barreta Faro Algarve 
Praia de Trafal Quarteira Algarve 
Praia Grande Silves Algarve 
Praia João de Arens, Portimão Algarve 
Praia dos Pinheiros Lagos Algarve 
 Praia da Bordeira in Carrapateira (full nudity is acceptable beyond the popular area)
 Praia do Meco in Sesimbra near Lisbon
 Praia da Bela Vista near Lisbon
 Praia do Salto near Porto Covo, Alentejo
Praia do Malhão Odemira, Alentejo
 Cabanas Velhas beach near Lagos, Portugal, Algarve
 Praia de Adegas in Alentejo
 Rio Alto Beach in Póvoa de Varzim, near Oporto
 Duna Alta beach near Oporto
 Praia das Furnas, Odemira
 Praia da Afurada, Ferragudo
 Barreta Island, Faro

Romania 

Nudist beaches are at Neptun, Costineşti, 2 Mai and Vama Veche sea resorts, and the beach between Eforie Nord and Eforie Sud on the Black Sea. Also on Sulina and Sfântu Gheorghe, Tulcea (Danube Delta) there are a few wild beaches used for nudism.

The cold baths in the Techirghiol lake (Băile reci Techirghiol) in Eforie Nord offer a separated clothing optional beach.

Toplessness is tolerated on all Romanian beaches .

Russia 

 The Dunes Beach near Sestroretsk (north of St. Petersburg)
 Divnomorskoe
 Loo (Sochi)
 Serebryanyi Bor (Moscow)
 Flyus beach west of Yekaterinburg
 Shershni (behind City beach of the Chelyabinsk)

Serbia 

Belgrade has several nudist beaches, including:
 Ada Ciganlija nudist part
 Obala
 Platforma za Sunchanje
 Diznilend
 Hronična Bara
 Kamenjar near Novi Sad has a nudist beach on the Danube

Slovakia 
Social nudity places in Slovakia are listed on the website of the "Asociácia Slovenských Naturistov" (Association of Slovak Naturists), a member of the International Naturist Federation.

 Bajč
 Batizovce
 Bešeňová thermal park
 Bukovec (Košice)  48°42'1.97"N  21°9'38.50"E
 Čunovo
 Geča (Košice)
 Harčáš (Komárno)
 Liptovská Mara
 Nové Košariská
 Nové Mesto nad Váhom - Zelená Voda
 Ratnovská zátoka
 Rusovce
 Senec - štrkovisko u Slnečných jazier
 Šútovo
 Zlaté Piesky

Slovenia 
 Camp Smlednik (Smlednik)
 Banovci Spa (Banovci)
 Atlantis Water Park (Ljubljana)
Naturist Camp Mali Raj
Camp Dragočajna (Dragočajna)
The Golden Club Tivoli (Ljubljana)
Terme Lendava (Lendava)
Društvo Naturistov Mali Raj (Dolenje Polje)

Spain 

Public nudity on the beach is, in general, not illegal in Spain, however some local municipalities do outlaw nudity on beaches that are within city limits. The city of Cadiz is one example.

For nudity enthusiasts, Spain offers various options for nude sunbathing. In addition to the long sandy beaches in the vicinity of large cities, topless sunbathing is possible on all beaches, even in front of smaller villages.

Following a request by the Association for the Development of Naturism (ADN) an email was sent by the city of Madrid's sports department to the 21 district heads explaining that municipal pools, if they see fit, have authorization to organize a "Bathing Suit-Free Day", or an "Optional Bathing Suit Day", some time in the 2016 summer.

Female toplessness was officially legalized at the public pools of the municipalities of Galdakao and L'Ametlla del Vallès in March 2016 and June 2018, respectively.

Canary Islands 
On the island of Gran Canaria the following are some of the beaches where nudism is practised:
Maspalomas
Playa del Inglés
Montaña de Arena
Guayedra
GüiGüi
Medio Almud
Tiritaña
Aguadulce
El Confital
 Charco del Palo on the island Lanzarote
 La Caleta on the two wild beaches (one sand, one rocky), over the cliffs to the north of the town on the island of Tenerife

Mainland (Peninsula and Balearic Islands) 
There are hundreds of public nudist beaches in mainland Spain, all over the coast line, and some more inland. This is only a selection:
 El Fonoll in Catalonia
 Formentera (Balearic Islands).
 Vera Playa and Cabo de Gata beaches in Almería (province)
 Bolnuevo and El Portús, in Región de Murcia.
 Mar Bella beach is the primary clothing optional beach for the city of Barcelona.
 Praia de Figueiras also known as "Praia dos Alemáns" on the Cíes Islands in Galicia.

Although nudism is not illegal, it is preferable to practise it on beaches meant for that specific purpose. This is a list of nudist beaches

Sweden 
 Stockholm area:
 Ågesta Nude Beach: Official nude beach on Magelungen, maintained by NF EOS, the Scandinavian Naturalist Federation. Located about 10 km south of central Stockholm.
 Långholmen: Unofficial ("spontaneous") nude beach, located on the western end of Långholmen island.
 Källtorp Nude Beach: Unofficial ("spontaneous") nude beach, located about 6 km southeast of central Stockholm, on the southeastern end of Källtorp lake. The beach is rocky and there are no public conveniences.
 PGs Udde Nude Beach: Unofficial ("spontaneous") nude beach, located about 5 km southeast of central Stockholm, on the northern end of Källtorp lake
Saltsjöbadens friluftsbad: Public bath with two nude swimming outdoor sections, one for women and one for men. Located in Saltsjöbaden in Nacka Municipality.
 Gothenburg area:
 Amundön: Officially nude beach on the rocks of an island south of Gothenburg, between Askim and Billdal.
 Bohuslän:
 Kattholmen, unofficial nude beach at Saltö in Strömstad municipality. 
 Korsholmen, unofficial nude beach on Koster in Strömstad municipality.
Scania
Svanrevet is an official nudist beach on the Falsterbonäset peninsular and is located north of the marina of Skanör, just outside the town of Skanör med Falsterbo
Solhejdans Naturist camping site

Switzerland

Public nudity is generally legal in the entire country with the notable exception of the Canton of Appenzell Innerrhoden where public nudity, including naked hiking, carries a fine of up to 200 Swiss francs. Nude hiking is mainly popular in the sparsely populated alpine regions among nudists, less so in the low lands.

Ukraine 

The nude beaches in Ukraine are closed due to the 2022 Russian invasion of Ukraine.
 Odessa
 Chkalovsky Nudist Beach, located south of Delfin beach and north of Arcadia Beach 
 Tikhiy 
 Zatoka
 On the long sandspit between Zatoka and Kurortne is nudity practised. Starts from: 
 Kyiv
 Dovbychka clothing-optional beach, located on Trukhaniv Island in front of Hydropark
 Obolon naturist beach, located south of yacht club
 Kharkiv
 Bezliudivka biggest nudist beach in Eastern Ukraine

United Kingdom 
Public nudity is legal in England and Wales unless the intent is to cause ‘Harassment, Alarm or Distress’. However, many of the public are unaware of this and nudity elsewhere than an accepted venue is likely to provoke a negative reaction. In 2019 the Crown Prosecution Service published a clarification to help police officers assess whether the law was really being broken in cases of public nudity. In response the College of Policing created a decision aid for its officers.

Though nudity is legal everywhere the following is a list of sites where nudity is not queried by the general public.

England

Cornwall
 Downderry, South East Cornwall
Carbeil Naturist Holiday Park
Carlyon Bay – Polgaver Beach.
Vault Beach near Gorran Haven
Pedn Vounder Beach, Porthcurno.
Porthluney Cove (part of the Caerhays Castle estate).
Porth Kidney (Lelant). 
Porthzennor Cove near Zennor Head.
Porthmeor beach near St Ives, Cornwall.
Perranporth – Perran Beach 
Gunwalloe 
Flexbury Beach – Bude

Devon
 Acorns Naturist Retreat, a naturist resort near Tiverton, Devon
 Weston Mouth, near Sidmouth, South Devon
 Slapton Sands, between Dartmouth and Kingsbridge, South Devon
 Budleigh Salterton, South Devon
 Broadsand Cove, Thurlestone South Devon

Dorset
 Ringstead Bay, Weymouth, Dorset
 Rivendell, a landed naturist club in Dorset
 Studland Bay, Dorset - most famous UK nudist beach, now officially approved (after years of controversy) by landowner the National Trust

Hertfordshire 

 Diogenes Naturist Club near Maple Cross in Hertfordshire.
 Spielplatz, Hertfordshire naturist resort accommodation, caravan and camping pitches near St Albans, Hertfordshire
 British Naturism:Sun-Folk Society - naturist club near St Albans, Hertfordshire
 Fiveacres Country Club,  a naturist club in Bricket Wood, Hertfordshire.
 Watford naturist swimming club. A weekly naturist swimming session held at Watford Leisure Centre.

Other counties
 Druridge Bay, Northumberland
 South Gare Beach near Redcar, North Yorkshire
 Fraisthorpe Beach near Bridlington, East Riding of Yorkshire 
 Clover Spa and Hotel, Birmingham
Heritage Family Naturist Club, Crowthorne, Berkshire. 
 Ashdene Naturist Club, between Brighouse and Elland, West Yorkshire
 Birling Gap, between Eastbourne and Seaford, East Sussex
 Cliff beach in Brighton, East Sussex.
Fairlight Glen, near Hastings, East Sussex
 Blackgang Beach, near Blackgang Chine, Isle of Wight
 Corton Beach, near Lowestoft, Suffolk (closed 2009)
 Highgate Ponds, Hampstead Heath, London
 Eastney Beach, Portsmouth, Hampshire
 Hill Head Beach, Stubbington, Hampshire (below cliffs, quarter mile west of beach huts near Titchfield Haven)
 Holkham Beach, Norfolk
 Lakeside Farm Lincolnshire, naturist resort low cost accommodation, caravan and camping pitches near Skegness
 Leysdown East Beach, Isle of Sheppey, North Kent
 Morecambe Bay Naturist Club, ten miles north of Lancaster and less than a mile from Morecambe Bay
 St Osyth, near Clacton-on-Sea, Essex

Wales 
 Morfa Dyffryn, between Barmouth and Harlech, Gwynedd
 Tything Barn, Pembrokeshire, West Wales
Cefn Sidan
Kenfig Burrows
Marros Sands
Newborough Warren
Whiteford Sands

Scotland 

Male and female toplessness tolerated on most beaches. The following are beaches where naturism is practised.
 Cleat's Shore, Isle of Arran, Firth of Clyde
 Ardeer, North Ayrshire, Firth of Clyde

Notes

References

Sources

Europe
Europe
Europe-related lists
Lists of places